Agdistis notabilis is a moth in the family Pterophoridae. It was first described in 2009 after specimens collected from near Tarrafal, northern Santiago Island, Cape Verde.

References

Agdistinae
Plume moths of Africa
Moths of Cape Verde
Fauna of Santiago, Cape Verde
Moths described in 2009